The Suai Church massacre occurred on 6 September 1999, in Suai, Cova Lima District in southwestern East Timor, two days after the results of the independence referendum were announced.

Massacre
According to the International Commission of Inquiry on East Timor's report to the Secretary-General of the United Nations, several hundred persons had sought refuge in the Ave Maria church from attacks of the pro-Indonesia Laksaur militia in the city. Then the militia, with the support of the military of Indonesia, killed up to 200 people. Twenty-six bodies were identified that had been buried across the border in West Timor, but eyewitnesses claim many more were killed.

Five Indonesian officials—Lieutenant Colonel Liliek Kusardiyanto, Captain Ahmad Syamsudin, Lieutenant Sugito, police Colonel Gatot Subiaktoro, and District Head Herman Sedyono—were tried in Indonesia for these crimes but were acquitted. The UN named them and eleven other men in an indictment filed by the UN Serious Crimes Unit in Dili, accusing them of 27 counts of crimes against humanity including murder, extermination, enforced disappearance, torture, and deportation.

See also
 List of massacres in East Timor

External links
 ETAN (East Timor and Indonesia Action Network) page, including excerpts from the UN report and eyewitness accounts
 Human Rights Watch page discussing acquittal of the five implicated Indonesian officials
 Suai Church Massacre drawing by Suai youth & Photograph of Church
 Drawings of Massacre by Suai Youth 2000
 Short Documentary about Suai Church Massacre

1999 in East Timor
Indonesian occupation of East Timor
Massacres in 1999
Massacres in Indonesia
Massacres in religious buildings and structures
September 1999 events in Asia
Massacres in East Timor